Carl Epting Mundy III (born 1960) is a retired lieutenant general in the United States Marine Corps, who last served as commander of the United States Marine Forces Central Command. He previously served as commander of the United States Marine Forces Special Operations Command. He is the son of Carl Epting Mundy Jr., who was a Marine Corps general and Commandant of the Marine Corps.

Marine Corps career
Mundy graduated from Auburn University in 1983 and was commissioned a second lieutenant. Mundy graduated from USMC Officer Candidate School and The Basic School. He received assignment to 2nd Battalion, 1st Marines, where he commanded a rifle platoon. As a captain, he commanded rifle company in the 1st Marine Division. He deployed to Somalia during Operation Restore Hope. Mundy later served as executive officer of the 1st Marine Regiment. Upon promotion to the rank of lieutenant colonel, Mundy assumed command of 3rd Battalion, 5th Marines. He deployed twice to Iraq, first as a battalion commander and later as a Marine Expeditionary Unit commander during Operation Iraqi Freedom. As a colonel, Mundy commanded the 6th Marine Regiment.

Mundy is a graduate of the Marine Corps Command and Staff College, Joint Forces Staff College and the USMC School of Advanced Warfighting.

Mundy has also served various staff and training assignments, beginning with the Marine Corps Recruit Depot Parris Island in South Carolina; The Basic School at Marine Corps Base Quantico; operations officer, I Marine Expeditionary Force headquarters at Camp Pendleton; the Marine Corps Office of Legislative Affairs; the Joint Improvised Explosive Device Defeat Organization in Washington D.C.; Headquarters Marine Corps in Washington D.C; United States Central Command in Tampa; and as the Deputy Commanding General of I Marine Expeditionary Force at Camp Pendleton. As a brigadier general, he served as both the Commanding General of 5th Marine Expeditionary Brigade and the Commander of Task Force 51 located in Bahrain. 
Mundy relinquished command of 5th Marine Expeditionary Brigade to Brigadier General Francis L. Donovan on June 23, 2016. As a major general, Mundy took command of Marine Corps Forces Special Operations Command (MARSOC) from 2016 to 2018. Mundy relinquished command of MARSOC to Major General Daniel Yoo in August 2018. After being promoted to lieutenant general, Mundy assumed command of Marine Corps Forces Central Command.

He retired from active duty in October 2021.

Awards and decorations

References

1960 births
Living people
Recipients of the Defense Superior Service Medal
Recipients of the Legion of Merit
United States Marine Corps generals
United States Marine Corps personnel of the Gulf War
United States Marine Corps personnel of the Iraq War